Émile Sagot (1805–1888) was a French illustrator and lithographer.

References

External links 

French illustrators
French lithographers
1805 births
1888 deaths